Litobrenthia japonica is a moth in the family Choreutidae. It was described by Syuti Issiki in 1931. It is found in Japan and China (Zhejiang).

The larvae feed on Quercus acuta, Quercus gilva and Quercus myrsinaefolia.

References

Choreutidae
Moths described in 1930